Taybad (also Romanized as Tāybād, Taīabad, and Tayebad; also known as Tāyebāt and Ţayyebāt) is a city and capital of Taybad County, in Razavi Khorasan Province, Iran. At the 2006 census, its population was 46,228, in 10,230 families. While most Iranians, and especially most Iranian Persians, are predominantly Shia, a majority of the population of Taybad are Persian Sunnis. Taybad is near the border with Afghanistan, and there is an official crossing point to Islam Qala in Afghanistan. 

Melons and watermelons are the souvenirs of Taybad. Taybad has a suitable climate for cultivating these fruits compared to other parts of Iran.

References 

Populated places in Taybad County
Cities in Razavi Khorasan Province
Afghanistan–Iran border crossings